The Army Black Knights men's ice hockey team is a National Collegiate Athletic Association (NCAA) Division I college ice hockey program that represents the United States Military Academy. The Black Knights are a member of Atlantic Hockey and play at the Tate Rink in West Point, New York.

History
The men's ice hockey program at West Point has been in existence since the 1903–04 season. The team played outdoors until 1930 when the Smith Rink opened. The team competed as independent members of NCAA Division I from the inaugural season through the 1960–61 season. In 1961 the program became a founding member of the ECAC. The team, known at the time as the Army Cadets, played as members of the ECAC from 1961 to 1962 season through the 1972–73 season before dropping their program to Division II status when the NCAA instituted numerical divisions. The Cadets would remain there until 1980 when they rejoined the ECAC as an associate member. Army became a full ECAC member in 1984 in the aftermath of the Hockey East schism but the Cadets wouldn't remain for long and left the conference in 1990. The Cadets joined the Metro Atlantic Athletic Conference (MAAC), which began sponsoring men's hockey at the time, in 1999 and in 2001 the team name was changed to Army Black Knights along with the other athletic programs at the Academy. In 2003, the MAAC's ice hockey division split off and became the Atlantic Hockey Association, a hockey-only NCAA Division I conference.

In 2007–08 season the Black Knights won their only conference title to date, the Atlantic Hockey Regular Season Championship. In that season the Knights finished with an overall record of 19 wins, 14 losses, and 4 ties and went 17–8–3 in conference play. Took the No. 1 seed into the Atlantic Hockey playoffs and swept (#10) American Int'l two games to none in the three game first round series. The Black Knight's season came to an end in the semifinal game when they lost to (#5) Mercyhurst 2–4.

Since 1950, the Cadets/Black Knights have been coached by a member of the Riley family. Jack Riley, best known for leading the United States to the gold medal at the 1960 Winter Olympics, coached at West Point from 1950 to 1986. He handed the reins to his son Rob in 1986, who in turn handed coaching duties to his younger brother Brian in 2004.

Army–RMC rivalry 

The Army Black Knights have a long-standing rivalry with the Royal Military College of Canada (RMC) Paladins. It is considered one of the longest-running annual international sporting events in the world.

The tradition originated when the commandant of RMC, Sir Archibald McDonnell, and the superintendent of the U.S. Military Academy, Brigadier General Douglas MacArthur, suggested a game of ice hockey between the two schools in 1921. After two years of exchanging ideas, the first game was played on February 23, 1923, at West Point. The Redmen won that first game 3–0. In 1924 the series moved to Kingston, Ontario (the location of RMC), thus beginning the tradition of rotating venues. This was Army's first away game and up until 1941, the West Point Game was the only time that Army played away from the Academy.

From 1923 to 1935 RMC ran up a record of 14–0–1, the only blemish being a 4–4 tie in 1935. 1939 saw Army win its first game, 3–1. As a result of World War II, only one game was played, a 3–1 Army win in 1942, over the next 10 years.

In the 1950s and 1960s Army won 15 of 20 games, bringing the series close with RMC holding a 21–18–1 advantage. Throughout the 1970s and 1980s the teams played fairly closely. In 1986 the record stood at 26–25–4 in favor of RMC.

From 1988 to 1999, Army dominated the rivalry, going undefeated. RMC last won in 2002 by a score of 3–0 and Army won in 2004, 3–2.

The 2006 game was a 3–3 tie in front of 3100 fans in Kingston. Currently Army leads the Series 39–29–7.

The game was played continually after the World War II years, from 1949 until 2007. The 2007 edition of the rivalry was to take place on Saturday Feb 10, at Tate Arena in West Point, New York, but was cancelled due to regular season scheduling conflicts and for 2008 the teams will not play a competitive game but instead the Paladins will travel to New York to spend 3 days practicing, playing and socializing with the West Point cadets.

The series was re-established on February 4, 2011, with Army hosting the Paladins at West Point. This rivalry will continue on an annual basis, counting as an exhibition game for both teams.

Season-by-season results

All-time coaching records 
As of March 7, 2023

Awards

U.S. Hockey Hall of Fame
The following individuals have been inducted into the United States Hockey Hall of Fame.

Jack Riley (1979, 2000†)

† As the coach of the 1960 Olympic team.

IIHF Hall of Fame
The following individuals have been inducted into the IIHF Hall of Fame.

Jack Riley (1998)

Army Sports Hall of Fame
The following individuals have been inducted into the Army Sports Hall of Fame.

Jack Riley (2004)

Lester Patrick Award
The following individuals have been awarded the Lester Patrick Award.

Jack Riley (1986, 2002)

NCAA

Individual awards

Spencer Penrose Award
Jack Riley (1957, 1960)

Lowes' Senior CLASS Award
 Cheyne Rocha (2013)

Derek Hines Unsung Hero Award
 Chase Podsiad (2008)

NCAA Scoring Champion
 David Merhar (1969)

All-Americans
AHCA Second Team All-Americans
2007–08: Josh Kassel, G
2020–21: Trevin Kozlowski, G; Colin Bilek, F
2021–22: Colin Bilek, F

MAAC

Individual awards

Offensive Player of the Year
 Chris Casey (2002)

Goaltender of the Year
 Brad Roberts (2003)

Defensive Rookie of the Year
 Brad Roberts (2003)

All–MAAC teams
First Team

 Brad Roberts (2003)

Second Team 

 Joe Dudek (2003)

Rookie Team

 Chris Casey (2002)
 Brad Roberts (2003)

Atlantic Hockey

Individual awards

Player of the Year
 Josh Kassel: 2008

Rookie of the Year
 Tyler Pham: 2015
 Lincoln Hatten: 2021
 Max Itagaki: 2023

Best Defenseman
 Zach McKelvie: 2008
 Alexander Wilkinson: 2018

Individual Sportsmanship Award
 Chris Garceau: 2005
 Zak Zaremba: 2015
 Ryan Nick: 2017
 Alex Wilkinson: 2020
 Daniel Haider: 2022

Regular Season Scoring Trophy
 Colin Bilek: 2022

Regular Season Goaltending Award
 Josh Kassel: 2008
 Trevin Kozlowski: 2021

Coach of the Year
 Brian Riley: 2006, 2007, 2008, 2021

All-Atlantic Hockey Teams
First Team

 Josh Kassel (2008)
 Zach McKelvie (2008, 2009)
 Luke Flicek (2008)
 Owen Meyer (2009)
 Alexander Wilkinson (2018)
 Trevin Kozlowski (2021)
 Thomas Farrell (2021)
 Colin Bilek (2021, 2022)

Second Team

 Brad Roberts (2006)
 Tim Manthey (2006, 2007)
 Josh Kassel (2007)
 Owen Meyer (2008)
 Marcel Alvarez (2010, 2011)
 Cody Omilusik (2010)
 Parker Gahagen (2016, 2017)
 Michael Wilson (2018)
 Dalton MacAfee (2019)
 Dominic Franco (2020)
 John Zimmerman (2021)
 Gavin Abric (2022)
 Anthony Firriolo (2022)
 Joey Baez (2023)

Third Team

 Luke Flicek (2007)
 Cody Omilusik (2011)
 John Keranen (2023)

Rookie Team

 Tim Manthey (2006)
 Owen Meyer (2007)
 Marcel Alvarez (2009)
 Joe Kozlak (2013)
 C. J. Reuschlein (2014)
 Tyler Pham (2015)
 Alexander Wilkinson (2017)
 Dominic Franco (2017)
 John Zimmerman (2018)
 Anthony Firriolo (2020)
 Lincoln Hatten (2021)
 Max Itagaki (2023)

Statistical leaders

Career scoring leaders

GP = Games played; G = Goals; A = Assists; Pts = Points; PIM = Penalty minutes

Career goaltending leaders

GP = Games played; Min = Minutes played; GA = Goals against; SO = Shutouts; SV% = Save percentage; GAA = Goals against average

Minimum 35 games

Statistics current through the start of the 2017-18 season.

Roster
As of August 16, 2022.

Olympians
This is a list of Army alumni were a part of an Olympic team.

Black Knights in the NHL
As of July 1, 2022.

See also
 Army Black Knights

References

External links
Army Black Knights men's ice hockey

 
Ice hockey teams in New York (state)